Cast a Light is the first studio album from American producer Thom Donovan. It was released on March 30, 2010, through Lapush Recordings and AWAL.

Track listing

References

2010 debut albums
Thom Donovan albums